The Catalan Pre-Coastal Range is a system of mountain ranges running parallel to the Mediterranean Sea coast in Catalonia. It is part of the Catalan Mediterranean System. Its main axis runs between the Catalan Transversal Range and the Serra de l'Espina, which connects with the Ports de Tortosa-Beseit, part of the Iberian System. The highest point is 1.706,7 m at the Montseny Massif.

Mountain ranges
From North to South:
Les Guilleries 
Montseny Massif
Sant Llorenç de Munt
Montserrat
Serra de Queralt, Bellprat
Picorandan 
Serra de Prades
Montsant
Serra de Llaberia
Tivissa-Vandellòs Mountains. Towards the southern end of the Catalan Pre-Coastal Range there are certain coastal mountain ranges like los Dedalts, Moles del Taix and Serra de la Mar which —lacking a traditional geographical name as a group— have been recently named as the 'Tivissa-Vandellòs Mountains' (Muntanyes de Tivissa-Vandellòs). These are included in the Pre-Coastal Range owing to the geological continuity with that range despite their direct seaside location in the Coll de Balaguer area. 
Massís de Cardó
Serra de la Vall de la Torre
Serra de Cavalls 
Serra de Pàndols 
Serra del Montsià. A limestone range located by the coast south of the Ebre river.

Ecology
The protected areas in the Catalan Pre-Coastal Range are: Parc Natural del Montseny, Parc Natural de Sant Llorenç del Munt i l'Obac, Parc Natural de Montserrat, Parc Natural dels Ports de Tortosa-Beseit and Parc Natural de la Serra de Montsant.

See also
Catalan Coastal Range
Montseny Range
Montserrat (mountain)

References

External links
Muntanyes de Tivissa-Vandellòs
Neotectonic features of the Catalan Coastal Ranges

Mountain ranges of Catalonia